Carlisle is an unincorporated community in Fillmore County, Nebraska, United States.

History
Carlisle was originally called Walters, and under the latter name was platted in 1901. It was later renamed Carlisle in honor of John G. Carlisle, the U.S. Secretary of the Treasury in the Grover Cleveland administration.

References

Unincorporated communities in Fillmore County, Nebraska
Unincorporated communities in Nebraska